Emmanuel Hackman (born 14 May 1995) is a professional football player who plays for the Serbian club Mladost GAT. Born in Ghana, he plays for the Togo national team.

Club career
Hackman made his professional debut in the Primeira Liga for Boavista on 6 December 2015, coming on as a second-half substitute for Anderson Correia in a 2–3 loss to Arouca.

On 1 July 2021, Hackman signed a three-year contract with Gil Vicente.

International career
Hackman was born in Ghana to a Ghanaian Ewe father and Togolese mother. He was called up to the Togo national team for a set of friendlies in March 2022. He debuted for Togo in a 3–0 friendly win over Sierra Leone on 24 March 2022.

References

External links
 
 

1995 births
Footballers from Accra
Togolese people of Ghanaian descent
Ghanaian people of Togolese descent
Sportspeople of Ghanaian descent
Sportspeople of Togolese descent
Citizens of Togo through descent
Living people
Togolese footballers
Togo international footballers
Ghanaian footballers
Association football defenders
Liberty Professionals F.C. players
S.C. Vila Real players
Boavista F.C. players
C.D. Aves players
Portimonense S.C. players
Gil Vicente F.C. players
Primeira Liga players
Liga Portugal 2 players
Campeonato de Portugal (league) players
Serbian SuperLiga players
Togolese expatriate footballers
Ghanaian expatriate footballers
Expatriate footballers in Portugal
Togolese expatriate sportspeople in Portugal
Ghanaian expatriate sportspeople in Portugal
Expatriate footballers in Serbia
Togolese expatriate sportspeople in Serbia
Ghanaian expatriate sportspeople in Serbia